Madelaine Nathalie Edlund (born 15 September 1985) is a Swedish former footballer who played for the Swedish national team and clubs including Umeå, Tyresö and Saint Louis Athletica. Her mother is from Chile.

Club career
During the 2007–2008 UEFA Women's Champions League quarterfinals, Edlund scored twice against FCL Rapide Wezemaal in Umeå IK's 6–0 victory.

In 2010 Edlund had a short spell with American Women's Professional Soccer (WPS) club Saint Louis Athletica. She started one game and made three substitute appearances before the team folded.

Edlund collected her third Damallsvenskan title in 2012, after Tyresö's dramatic last day win over Malmö. She scored the winning goal after Caroline Seger's shot had hit the post.

Edlund returned to training with Tyresö FF ahead of the 2014 season, after missing much of the previous campaign due to maternity leave. When Tyresö became insolvent and were kicked out of the league, Edlund rejoined her first senior club Sunnanå SK. In December 2014 she announced her second pregnancy and retirement from football at the age of 29.

International career
Edlund's debut for Sweden was on 30 October 2007 in a game against Denmark, the result was 2–1 in favour of Denmark.

In February 2013, Edlund was ruled out of contention for Sweden's UEFA Women's Euro 2013 squad, due to pregnancy.

Honours
Umeå IK
 Damallsvenskan: Winner 2006, 2007, 2008
 Svenska Cupen: Winner 2007
 Svenska Supercupen: Winner 2007, 2008

Tyresö FF
 Damallsvenskan: Winner 2012

References

External links

National Team Profile
Club profile

1985 births
Living people
Swedish women's footballers
Swedish expatriate women's footballers
Sweden women's international footballers
Saint Louis Athletica players
Expatriate women's soccer players in the United States
2011 FIFA Women's World Cup players
Footballers at the 2012 Summer Olympics
Olympic footballers of Sweden
Tyresö FF players
Damallsvenskan players
Umeå IK players
Women's Professional Soccer players
Sunnanå SK players
Swedish expatriate sportspeople in the United States
Sportspeople from Jönköping
Women's association football forwards
2007 FIFA Women's World Cup players